The Thursday Next series by Jasper Fforde currently consists of the novels The Eyre Affair, Lost in a Good Book, The Well of Lost Plots, Something Rotten, First Among Sequels, One of Our Thursdays Is Missing and The Woman Who Died a Lot.

The Eyre Affair

Victor Analogy
In his seventies, Analogy is the head of the Swindon branch of SO-27, the LiteraTecs, and is therefore Thursday's immediate superior.

Bowden Cable
An operative for SO-27, the LiteraTecs, assigned to the Swindon branch, and Thursday's partner after her transfer. In his thirties and with a slightly fussy, nervous edge to him, Bowden is intelligent and, at times, quite sly and cunning. He was responsible for thwarting the plans of Jack Schitt and the Goliath Corporation when he substituted a copy of Edgar Allan Poe's poem "The Raven" in place of the weapons manual that Schitt thought he was accessing. He shares his name with the braking cable on bicycles. Another character is called Sturmey Archer, also a manufacturer of bicycle gears.

Acheron Hades
Hugely intelligent and equally immoral (believes in doing what is morally evil, as opposed to amorality, which would mean not believing in a moral good or evil), Acheron Hades started out as a lecturer in English, teaching, among others, Thursday Next, before he turned to a life of crime. Believed by some to be only half-human, the other half being allegedly demonic or vampiric in nature (he casts no shadow), Acheron possesses a number of mysterious powers (as, indeed, do most of his siblings). He cannot be photographed or recorded in any way, and has shown the ability to know when his name is uttered within a considerable distance (a radius of 1000 yards, and possible further), hence his name is not often spoken aloud (compare Lord Voldemort, or The Chandrian). He has shown an immunity to the effects of most weapons, his only confirmed vulnerability being to silver. Said to have the ability to "lie in thought, word, action and appearance" he also possesses formidable powers of deception, including the ability to assume the shape of others and hypnotic persuasive abilities on the "weaker minded" (he is unable to hypnotise Thursday). Another ability that possibly follows in this vein is his ability to pass through glass barriers by making the glass soft and pliable through heated touch; after he withdraws his hand the glass reverts to its original state, the only sign of his trespass being the slightly mottled surface of the glass where his hand passed through (shown when Thursday examines the empty Chuzzlewit glass security casing). He appears to possess great strength, at one point easily smashing his way through a wall, although inertia still has an effect on him. Time does not seem to have a proper hold on him either, as when it is stopped around him by Colonel Next, he remains unaffected (this might possibly be why he does not seem to age). He is either very good at guessing or possesses some form of telepathy as he can figure out the personality faults and mental weaknesses of a person within moments.

Hades appears as the principal villain of The Eyre Affair. He kidnaps Mycroft Next and steals his Prose Portal, using it to enter stolen original manuscripts of such classic tales as Martin Chuzzlewit and Jane Eyre, with the aim of extracting characters from them and holding them to ransom. When Thursday rescued the extracted Jane Eyre, Hades escaped into the book, pursued by Thursday. Ultimately, they confronted each other in Thornfield Hall, where Thursday was finally able to eliminate her opponent once and for all.

Acheron is the eldest child of the Hades Family, which is apparently evil as a whole (only one member is mentioned as not really being evil, Lethe, the apparent "white sheep" of the family; another brother, Styx Hades, is shown to be more of a nuisance than really evil, committing pranks and not possessing any actual powers). It is also implied that they have been evil for generations; as Acheron's sister Aornis puts it, "No member of the Hades family has been captured alive for eighty-eight generations."

Hades has made the occasional appearance in the later books, showing up within Thursday's memories.

Both 'Acheron' and 'Hades' refer to places in the mythical Greek underworld, as do 'Styx' and 'Lethe'.

Braxton Hicks
Hicks is in charge of several divisions of SpecOps in Swindon, including the Literary Detectives to whom Thursday transfers. He is perpetually concerned with the budget and seemingly nothing else. He allows Jack Schitt to have his way at first and seemingly faces up poorly to higher authority, but in Something Rotten he invents an elaborate cover story for Thursday after her return. He is often practising his putting in his office and coaxes Thursday to join him for a round of golf; she accepts out of gratitude for his alibi. Hicks has several grown children and by Something Rotten is planning to retire shortly. The name is an allusion to Braxton Hicks contractions near the end of pregnancy.

Mrs. Nakajima
A Japanese literary tourist and member of JurisFiction. In Lost in a Good Book, she gives Thursday the tools to become a JurisFiction agent herself. After her husband retires, the couple moved into Thornfield Hall in the novel Jane Eyre, where they manage the house, carefully avoiding any appearances in the narrative.

Anton Next
Brother to Thursday and Joffy Next and best friend of Landen Parke-Laine. He fought in the Crimean War and died there during a disastrous battle which occurred after he accidentally sent his unit off in the wrong direction (this mimics the role of Captain Louis Nolan in the Charge of the Light Brigade in 1854; Anton directs the Light Armoured Brigade into the teeth of the Russian artillery). After much agonising over whether to tell the truth, Landen finally gave evidence to the inquest about Anton's error, which drove a wedge between him and Thursday, until the two reconciled during the events of The Eyre Afair.

Colonel Next
Thursday's father and ex-member of SO-12, the ChronoGuard. Went rogue, leading the ChronoGuard to delete him from history by interrupting his conception; however, due to his skills at time manipulation, still exists and drops in on his family from time to time to assist or pass on advice. By the events of Something Rotten, he has rejoined the ChronoGuard, albeit in a reduced capacity. In the end of First Among Sequels, he's reactualised.

Joffy Next
Brother of Thursday and Anton Next. He is a minister for the Global Standard Deity, which aims to represent all of the others equally and without prejudice, with the laudable aim of attempting to prevent religious conflict. Cheerful, frequently irreverent almost but (usually) not quite to the point of being irritating and laid-back, he nevertheless has an extremely caring nature and a great deal of wisdom, which serves him well in his chosen vocation. He generally calls Thursday 'Doofus' and used to slap her on the back of the head on a daily basis until she broke his nose to get him to stop, but the two are very close. As of Lost in a Good Book he is in a relationship with Miles Hawke, an operative with SpecOps-14.

Mycroft Next
Thursday's uncle and husband of Polly. Mycroft is an inventor of strange and unusual devices of varying degrees of use. Some have proved to be important plot devices throughout the series, such as his Prose Portal, which allowed real-world individuals to enter books and the Ovinator, which encourages cooperation. Others, such as his device for erasing memories (which he has no recollection of ever inventing) serve purely as running gags. He has been hunted by the Goliath Corporation, who wished to use his Prose Portal to retrieve fictional weaponry from the Bookworld to sell in the real world. He retired into the Bookworld, living within the Sherlock Holmes series of books, where he occasionally interfered with the narrative, appearing as Holmes' brother. By the time of Something Rotten he and Polly had returned safely to the real world, having used the memory erasure device to ensure that they were of no use to Goliath.

Polly Next
A brilliant mathematician, Thursday's aunt, and wife of Mycroft. She generally serves as Mycroft's assistant, as she possesses far more common sense than her husband. She was temporarily held hostage within the William Wordsworth poem I Wandered Lonely as a Cloud by Acheron Hades during the events of The Eyre Affair. Enjoys tormenting door-to-door salesmen along with Thursday's mother.

Thursday Next

Wednesday Next
Mother to Thursday Next and her brothers. She used to work for SpecOps 3 (and claims to still do so on occasion), but has now become something of a homebody, and is generally found there throughout the novels. She loves her husband, despite his eradication, but has occasional suspicions about his fidelity, particularly regarding his dealings with Lady Emma Hamilton. She herself is not immune to other men, it transpires, as she develops an apparent interest in Otto Bismarck when he stays with her for a few days. On the other hand, having no official husband, she is believed by most to have conceived three children outside of wedlock, something that affects her social life.

Landen Parke-Laine
Thursday's husband, Landen is an award-winning novelist whose books include Bad Sofa, Memoirs of A Crimean Veteran and Once Were Scoundrels. He served as an officer in the Crimean War (still raging in Fforde's alternate 1985), during which he came into contact with Thursday, with whom he fell in love, and her brother Anton, who became his best friend. During the disastrous battle which became known as the "Charge of the Light-Armoured Brigade", Anton was killed and Landen lost a leg. During the subsequent inquest, Landen, after much agonizing, admitted that Anton had made an error that had led to the destruction of their unit. As a result, Thursday left him and refused to speak to him for ten years. They came back into contact during the events of The Eyre Affair, during which Thursday was finally able to forgive Landen and agreed to marry him. Despite his missing leg, he is relied upon in dangerous situations.

During the events of Lost in a Good Book, Landen is eradicated from history by a rogue member of the Chronoguard, acting on behalf of the Goliath Corporation, who wish to blackmail Thursday into returning their operative Jack Schitt. He then appears only in Thursday's memories until reactualised during Something Rotten.

His name is one of Fforde's trademark puns: in the British edition of the board game Monopoly, Park Lane is the second-to-last street on the board and consequently one of the most expensive. As additions to this pun, Landen's late father is named Billden Parke-Laine and his mother is named Houson Parke-Laine.

Pickwick
Thursday's pet dodo, brought to life by genetic engineering. Originally she was believed to be male, but revealed to be female during the events of Lost in a Good Book, when she lays an egg. This ultimately hatches, producing her son, Alan. The name is a reference to Dickens's Pickwick Papers.

Jack Schitt
Head of the Goliath Corporation's internal security service and their Advanced Weapons Division, and thus a man of great power. He showed great interest in Mycroft Next's Prose Portal, hoping to use it to retrieve fictional weaponry, having utterly failed to make the equivalent weapon work in the real world, to the extent that he was willing to work with the criminal Acheron Hades in order to gain access. Once Hades was defeated within Jane Eyre, Schitt used the Prose Portal to enter what he thought was the manual for the plasma rifle that he wanted to retrieve, only to discover that Bowden Cable had slipped a copy of "The Raven" by Edgar Allan Poe inside the manual's dust cover instead. The Portal closed behind him, trapping him there.

He was ultimately retrieved by Thursday during the events of Lost in a Good Book, after Goliath arranged to have her husband Landen eradicated from history by the Chronoguard in order to blackmail her. She cooperated, only to find herself double-crossed. Schitt, however, never returned to his original position in the corporation; when next seen, during the events of Something Rotten, he has been demoted to a far lesser role within Goliath and makes only a brief appearance.

His name is a pun on 'jack shit', meaning 'nothing'.

Filbert Snood
A member of SpecOps 12, the ChronoGuard, Filbert dated Thursday until he experienced a mishap in the timestream and was too embarrassed to tell her. Thursday runs into him again while both are working for SpecOps 5 in pursuit of Acheron Hades. When introduced to "Snood," Thursday assumes he is his father and doesn't discover his true identity until he is killed by Hades.

Spike Stoker
Spike works for SO-17 and is the sole agent for that department assigned to the Reading area. He deals with undead paranormals and the capturing of Supreme Evil Beings, and occasionally enlists Thursday Next to assist with his work in exchange for money. Later in the series, he marries a woman named Cindy, who he believes to be a librarian, but is in fact an assassin. "Stoker" is a reference to Bram Stoker, author of Dracula;  "Spike" may be a reference to the shape of the wooden stakes that he uses in his line of work.

Spike is almost on his own against the forces of darkness, yet is arguably the cheeriest person seen in the books: he is jocular, easy-going and is rarely serious or distressed in his work. He loses his cool only rarely; and although he once, seemingly in a fit of depression, considered the possibility of self-sacrifice/suicide, admitting that "battling the undead was never a bowl of cherries," he was in fact trying to trick both Thursday and a Supreme Evil Being. In Something Rotten he offers to take Thursday's place in the afterworld when she is about to die, now knowing that his wife is an assassin, but Thursday persuades him to stay for the sake of their daughter Betty. Ultimately, his wife gives her life to save Thursday. He is described as a tall, muscular man with blond dreadlocks and sunglasses. It was once hinted that he suffers from either lycanthropy or vampirism and requires regular "medication"; without it he will sometimes lose control of himself and exhibit wolflike behavior, such as eating live mice.

Other Minor Characters
Other members of staff at the Swindon branch of SO-27, appear from time to time and are notable chiefly because their names are puns on Sea Areas known to UK radio listeners from the Shipping Forecast on BBC Radio 4.  These characters include Jim Crometty (named after the Sea Area 'Cromarty'); Sergeant Ross ('Ross'); Finisterre ('Finisterre', which was renamed 'FitzRoy' in 2002); Fisher ('Fisher'); Helmut Bight ('German Bight'); Malin ('Malin'); Sole ('Sole'); and the Forty brothers, Jeff and Geoff ('Forties').  Strictly speaking, Crometty does not appear in the book - having been murdered and replaced in the Swindon LiteraTecs team by Thursday.

Dr. Runcible Spoon (Professor of English Literature at Swindon University) is named after the utensil with which The Owl and the Pussycat dine on "mince and slices of quince" in a nonsense rhyme by Edward Lear.

Detective Inspector Oswald Mandias of Yorkshire CID (the policeman investigating the theft of the Jane Eyre manuscript from the Brontë Parsonage Museum in Haworth) is named after Ozymandias, the eponymous subject of Shelley's 1818 sonnet.

Lost in a Good Book

The Bellman
The head of JurisFiction. During the events of Lost in a Good Book and The Well of Lost Plots, this position is filled by an unnamed individual who is only ever referred to by his title. He was murdered in the latter, by Libris, weeks from retirement, and replaced by an obedient clone of himself. Following the successful intervention of The Great Panjandrum, the clone was demoted, and Thursday was then asked to assume the role, which she accepted, holding the position for around two years before resigning during the events of Something Rotten. The Bellman is hinted to be the lead character in Lewis Carroll's The Hunting of the Snark. He urges the PROs to "be careful out there", quoting the roll-call sergeant from Hill Street Blues.

The Cheshire Cat
Due to boundary changes (a reference to the Local Government Commissions) the Cheshire Cat is now technically referred to as the Unitary Authority of Warrington Cat, but still generally known by his original appellation. He serves as an über-librarian to the Grand Library, as well as a high-ranking JurisFiction official. His work is especially significant in Something Rotten, where after years of searching he finds Yorrick Kaine's origin—a self-published novel not even in the Library—and engages Kaine in a Merlin-versus-Madame Mim-esque battle of summoning literary warriors, eventually calling upon the Blue Fairy from Pinocchio to turn Kaine into a real person.

Vernham Deane
Resident cad within Daphne Farquitt's The Squire of High Potternews, Deane is an accomplished JurisFiction agent who in reality is nothing like his character in his novel. He is a potential target in The Well of Lost Plots along with Perkins and Havisham, but his disappearance makes him a suspect instead. He is revealed to have been hiding for his own safety with the serving girl he ravishes, with whom he is actually in love. They and Quasimodo help Thursday foil Harris Tweed and his cohorts, and Potternews is finally granted an Internal Plot Readjustment to allow Vernham and his lover to marry happily. His name presumably derives from the Hampshire village of Vernham Dean.

Daphne Farquitt
A reclusive septuagenarian author of trashy romances, Farquitt began writing in the 1930s and has little real variation in plot between her novels. Vernham Deane is one of her characters. Because she is the author of the vanity-published At Long Last Lust, origin of Yorrick Kaine, Kaine starts a campaign against all things Danish in an attempt to destroy every remaining copy of his book (Farquitt having been born in Copenhagen) so he cannot be deleted from within. Hamlet claims to have brought her and tens of thousands of her fans to the Superhoop to stop Kaine's interference, but in reality it was only nine fans and Farquitt remains as elusive as ever.

Cordelia Flakk
Cordelia is an attractive senior SpecOps agent who works in Public Relations. She spends the whole of Lost in a Good Book persistently trying to get Thursday to do press interviews regarding the alterations made to the storyline of Jane Eyre during the events of The Eyre Affair.

Aornis Hades
The younger sister of Acheron Hades, who appeared as a villain in Lost in a Good Book. Aornis Hades is a mnemonomorph, a person who can alter memories at will; she can also apparently alter entropy, a concept of science. The general law of entropy, as presented in the book, states that reactions can only become more chaotic; a plate can fall to the ground and shatter, but it cannot reassemble. Aornis lowers entropy, causing extremely large-scale and bizarre coincidences to occur. She held the world to ransom in Lost, giving Thursday the ultimatum that she would stop her plan if Thursday takes her own life. With her plan thwarted at the last minute by the intervention of Colonel Next, Aornis escaped. In First Among Sequels, she is seen imprisoned by the Chronoguard, in a time-loop inside the T.K. Maxx department store.

A mental copy of Aornis, embedded in Thursday's memories, made several appearances during the events of The Well of Lost Plots, often interacting with other 'personas' as recalled by Next. This copy was capable of altering Thursday's memories to suit her own purposes, but was finally defeated when she summoned Thursday's worst memory, which turned out to be a childhood nightmare. The Aornis copy was unable to control it and it destroyed her, and Thursday was left with the reassurance that defeating the real Aornis would now be easy. (Aornis and Thursday do not have their final confrontation until The Woman Who Died a Lot.)

Thursday claims that Aornis's name is derived from the fact that the Acheron, Lethe, Cocytus, Phlegethon, and Aornis rivers are all tributaries to the river Styx. However, in canonical descriptions of the underworld, there is no river by the name Aornis, nor are the other rivers tributary to the Styx- however they do all flow through the Greek Underworld and separate its different regions.

Miss Havisham
Miss Havisham is a member of the JurisFiction originating in the novel Great Expectations by Charles Dickens. She was assigned as Thursday Next's mentor when the younger woman first joined JurisFiction and tutored her through her examinations to become a fully fledged agent. A highly respected member of JurisFiction and one of their best operatives, her hobbies included driving powerful cars at terrifyingly high speeds. This hobby was eventually used against her during the events of The Well of Lost Plots, when a car she was driving was sabotaged, causing her to crash. Badly burned, she returned to her novel, where she and Pip staged her death within the novel. She is replaced by a generic understudy, which is understood by all to be 'not the same'.

Yorrick Kaine
Yorrick Kaine is a fictional character, originating in a highly limited self-published early novel by the author Daphne Farquitt. Kaine became a 'pagerunner', a character who escapes his or her own book and ultimately left the Bookworld altogether for the real world, where he ran for high political office during the events of Lost in a Good Book, only to be thwarted by Thursday and JurisFiction.

By the events of Something Rotten, Kaine had advanced to the office of Chancellor, making him the second most powerful man in the land. He was using Mycroft Next's invention, the Ovinator, to manipulate Parliament into doing what he wanted. During the events of that novel, where he was made real and ultimately lost the Ovinator, he was removed from power. First Among Sequels reveals he has been arrested and imprisoned.

Lavoisier
Member of the ChronoGuard and former partner of Colonel Next.  Appears briefly at the end of Eyre Affair, questioning Thursday about her father.  He plays a much larger role in Lost in a Good Book, where he is hired by Goliath to eradicate Landen Parke-Laine.  He holds a strong grudge against Thursday Next, and refuses to honor his part of the deal between her and Goliath as revenge for "what she did to him."  This action has yet to occur in Thursday's timeline.

Gran Next
Always clad in blue gingham, 108-year-old Gran Next claims not to be able to die until she's read the ten most boring classics. She helps Thursday realize her bookjumping abilities by having her read The  Flopsy Bunnies aloud over and over. In The Well of Lost Plots she comes to stay with Thursday in Caversham Heights and helps her to remember Landen and defeat Aornis's mindworm, assuring her that the real Aornis will be much easier.

Gran's identity comes into question later on when Thursday realizes that both her grandmothers are long dead and she's only known Gran Next for about three years. Finally when Thursday is sentenced for her Jane Eyre fiction infraction—twenty years in blue gingham and having to read the ten most boring classics before she can die—she realizes that Gran is herself seventy years in the future. As friends and yet-unborn family members gather, Thursday reads the last paragraph of The Faerie Queene to Gran, who dies peacefully.

Gran's long life includes many interesting jobs, such as working in many different divisions of SpecOps, spending twenty-four hours as a man and ruling as God Emperor of the Universe.

Perkins and Snell
David "Pinky" Perkins and Akrid Snell were the lead characters in a set of detective novels and both worked as JurisFiction agents.

Perkins headed up the Grammasite Research facility, in a land appropriated from an unpublished fantasy novel (The Sword of the Zenobians), which is populated by many fictional creatures who were unable to live safely within their own novels. He was slain when the Minotaur, held captive within the fantasy, was deliberately released to kill him.

Snell worked as the lawyer for JurisFiction. He is the first to contact Thursday by Footnoterphone in Lost in a Good Book, and as head of the JurisFiction legal team defends her at her first hearing in Franz Kafka's The Trial. When contact was lost with Perkins, he, accompanied by Thursday Next, Miss Havisham and Commander Bradshaw, entered the research facility to investigate. When a sample of the misspelling vyrus was released within Perkin's laboratory, Snell stayed behind to attempt to deal with it. He died from his injuries shortly afterwards.

Brik Schitt-Hawse
A senior Goliath employee and half-brother of Jack Schitt. Schitt-Hawse is primarily responsible for the eradication from history of Landen Parke-Laine during the events of Lost in a Good Book, in order to blackmail Thursday into retrieving Jack Schitt from inside Poe's The Raven. Thursday agreed to retrieve Schitt, only for Schitt-Hawse to subsequently imprison her, intending to study her bookjumping ability in order to open up new potential markets for the Goliath Corporation within fiction. Thursday was able to escape with the assistance of Miss Havisham and went to live in the Bookworld in order to hide from Goliath.

Schitt-Hawse reappeared briefly in Something Rotten, when Thursday visited the CEO of the Goliath Corporation during a board meeting.

He is almost invariably accompanied by his henchmen, Mr. Chalk and Mr. Cheese, although by the time of Something Rotten Cheese has been reassigned to work at a Goliath-owned café.

His name is a homonym of 'brick shithouse', from the phrase 'built like a brick shithouse'.

Bartholomew Stiggins
Bartholomew Stiggins is a Neanderthal and head of the Swindon branch of SpecOps-13. He helped Thursday out during the events of Lost in a Good Book when she has a run-in, engineered by Aornis Hades, with another Neanderthal. He reappears during Something Rotten, when he accompanies her to the old Goliath laboratory facilities in the hope of finding information that would allow his race to breed successfully, something that was left out when their race was brought back to life through genetic engineering. In return for Thursday's assistance, Stiggins helps her win a critical croquet game by providing a number of Neanderthal players to fill gaps on the team. His name is a reference to Stig of the Dump.

Cindy Stoker
Cindy is a professional assassin known as the Windowmaker (the first use of that name was due to a typographical error in a newspaper) who has finished off sixty-seven people (sixty-eight if you count Samuel Pring, but she later admits that was a fluke). In Something Rotten she has a contract to exterminate Thursday. Cindy is aware that Thursday knows she is an assassin, while Thursday knows Cindy wants to kill her. Spike is oblivious to both of these facts, and is happily married to her. After she is hit on the head by a falling piano stool she offers to replace a dying Thursday on her way to the afterlife, knowing she will never leave prison if she survives or be with Spike or their daughter again, and making up partly for her crimes.

Harris Tweed
A JurisFiction agent from the real world. He is revealed as being a villain towards the end of The Well of Lost Plots. As a result of his actions, Tweed was banished from the Bookworld and now lives in Swindon.  His name is a pun on both a type of rugged woollen cloth called Harris Tweed, and on the Eagle comics' similar character, Harris Tweed.

The Well of Lost Plots

Melanie Bradshaw
Wife of Trafford Bradshaw, to whom she has now been married for fifty years (the pair celebrate their golden wedding anniversary at the end of Something Rotten). As the books never describe her character to any great degree, Melanie remains in the background. Hence, no reader ever discovers that she is, in fact, a gorilla, although she often attempts to dress in standard female clothing, with varying degrees of success. Melanie often babysits Friday Next when Thursday is off on assignment and the two are very close.

Commander Trafford Bradshaw
The main character of a series of 1920s adventure stories for boys. An early Booksplorer, Bradshaw now works as an agent for JurisFiction (he is a former Bellman as well) and is considered to be one of their best operatives; his maps, while sometimes incomplete, are a most trusted resource for Bookworld explorers.

The Great Panjandrum
The supposed creator of the BookWorld, and is worshipped as a god.  Appears at the end of Well as a literal deus ex machina, as it is summoned by Thursday through an emergency glass box inside her standard issue equipment. It is unclear of the Great Panjandrum's true nature, and its appearance is based on the appearance of whoever views it; for example, Thursday sees it as a woman in her mid-thirties, like herself, while a noted Jurisfiction sculptor perceived the entity as a fellow stonemason. The Great Panjandrum is a reference to a line of nonsense verse by Samuel Foote.

The Minotaur
Wanted murderer in the Book World, he escapes and works under the alias of Norman Johnson. In Something Rotten he is tainted with Slapstick to help track him across fiction, but he uses it to try to kill Thursday several times. Based on the minotaur from Greek mythology.

Randolph and Lola
Assigned to stay with Thursday in the unpublished novel Caversham Heights during the events of Lost in a Good Book, Randolph and Lola started out as truly generic characters, being sexless, ageless, nameless and with no distinguishing features of any kind. Under Thursday's influence, the pair gradually began to take on more distinctive characteristics, developing personalities, choosing genders, apparent ages and final names, Thursday having initially dubbed them as obb and ibb respectively, just to distinguish between them. The two later gained capital letters before changing names. Randolph took on the persona and appearance of a gentleman in his fifties, hoping to be cast in the role of a father figure or kindly mentor. Lola developed as an attractive young woman, aiming for a position as heroine in an adventure-style tale. Although the pair argued constantly, they ultimately realized that they were in love and were instrumental in the reorganization of Caversham Heights into a book where characters from other novels could take holidays away from the rather repetitious nature of their roles.

DCI Jack Spratt
Jack Spratt is the main character in the unpublished novel Caversham Heights where Thursday stays as part of the Character Exchange Program during the events of The Well of Lost Plots. He is also the protagonist in his own series of books written by Fforde.

Mrs. Tiggy-Winkle
Mrs. Tiggy-Winkle is an active JurisFiction agent and their washerwoman. She trains Emperor Zhark and advocates for the appearances of hedgehogs in other works such as mentions in Shakespeare's plays. After Thursday's retirement she helps to run JurisFiction and visits Thursday asking for help.

Emperor Zhark
A ruthless tyrant from a series of sci-fi novels, Zhark begins work at JurisFiction around the same time as Thursday and is apprenticed to Mrs. Tiggy-Winkle. His conquests within his books, often involving the lives of millions, are a point of contention requiring the Judgement of Solomon. Often punished for overdoing it, such as when he invades a Western with his armies to save Thursday, accidentally killing the main character. When he learns that his author, Handley Paige, is planning to kill him off, he manages to track him down and convince him otherwise.

Something Rotten

Millon de Floss
Millon is a member of the Amalgamated Union of Stalkers, authorised by SpecOps-33. He has something of a talent for spotting rising stars, having started stalking the legendary actress Lola Vavoom when she was just a bit part player. He is now a Grade 1 stalker, allowed to stalk the very highest level of celebrity, but has, instead, chosen to become Thursday's officially licensed stalker, feeling that she, while not at the highest level as yet, is destined for great things. Having published his autobiography A Stalk on the Wild Side, Millon has attained a not-inconsiderable level of celebrity himself and has his own stalker, Adam Gnusense (who, as an experienced stalker himself, having risen to Grade 3, has recently acquired his own stalker, who he describes as being a Grade 34 loser after catching him rummaging through his dustbins).

Millon is intelligent, polite and has considerable knowledge of conspiracy theories, a resource that Thursday draws upon when trying to locate a clone of William Shakespeare. He accompanied her to Area 21, an area in mid-Wales where the Goliath Corporation had their laboratories, to help out. As this was technically outside the remit of his stalker activities, he asked, in return, if he could be her official biographer, something to which Thursday readily agreed.

Many of the excerpts from fictional works found at the beginning of each chapter have ostensibly been written by de Floss. His name is an allusion to the novel The Mill on the Floss by George Eliot, which Thursday and Miss Havisham visit on assignment in The Well of Lost Plots.

George Formby
Made England's President-for-life after his resistance work during the German Occupation, and his song "When I'm Washing Windows" becomes the national anthem. In 1988 he is still entertaining whenever possible, and he is the only politician who avoids Yorrick Kaine enough to remain immune to the ovinator and thus oppose Kaine's schemes. He dies of natural causes two days after the Swindon Mallets win the Superhoop croquet championship and serenades the ferryman on his final journey. In real life, George Formby died in 1961, at the age of 56.

John Henry Goliath V
Named after two giants and quite tall himself, John Henry Goliath V is the great-great-grandson of the founder of the Goliath Corporation and its current CEO. He meets with Thursday personally to apologize to her, but in reality he used Goliath's ovinator to convince her to forgive them. His fate after Goliath's loss to the Toast Marketing Board is unknown.

Hamlet
The Prince of Denmark, from the Shakespeare play. He accompanied Thursday on her return to the real world at the beginning of Something Rotten, as he was concerned at the perception in the Outland that he was an indecisive character. During his time there, he became romantically involved with Lady Emma Hamilton and found a new decisiveness within himself, one that he originally planned to take back into his play and rewrite it from within, portraying himself as a much more dynamic character. Ultimately, however, he came to realise that the flaws in his character are what make his play memorable and much loved, and elected to leave his play as it was. He chose to focus his energies elsewhere, joining JurisFiction as their agent for the Shakespearean and Marlowe plays.

Hamlet's Danish origins are a point of contention during Kaine's anti-Denmark campaign, but he bluffs Kaine into thinking he has gathered an army of Daphne Farquitt fans and the Copenhagen-born author herself to save Thursday at a critical moment. As a parting gift, Thursday gave Hamlet Alan the dodo, the tearaway son of her own dodo, Pickwick, to take with him, as Hamlet had proven to be the only one able to get Alan to behave himself.

Tuesday Next
Daughter of Thursday Next. She first appeared at the very end of Something Rotten, when many of Thursday's as-yet unborn descendants appear. In First Among Sequels, she is shown to be a mathematical genius, having solved Fermat's Last Theorem at the age of nine.

Friday Next
Friday is the son of Thursday and Landen Parke-Laine. While he is an infant during the chronology of the novels, Friday later joins SO-12, the Chronoguard, rising to become head of the department and, according to his grandfather, Colonel Next, a time manipulator of extraordinary skill. As such, he appears as an adult on a couple of occasions in the books, although is unidentified until the end of Something Rotten. As a baby, Friday speaks only Lorem Ipsum, due to his upbringing in the Bookworld. He is close to Melanie Bradshaw, who frequently baby-sat for him.

In First Among Sequels, Friday is apparently a lazy, slovenly adolescent whom Thursday calls a "tedious teenage cliché: grunting, sighing at any request, and staying in bed until past midday." In actuality, this indolence is a cover for his secret agenda to overthrow Chronoguard, which his future self has found to be corrupt.

William Shgakespeafe
The only surviving clone of William Shakespeare, created in a secret long-abandoned project by Goliath.  He is rescued by Thursday, Bowden, Stig, and Spike, and is recruited by JurisFiction to rewrite Hamlet and The Merry Wives of Windsor, which merged in Hamlet's absence.  Shgakespeafe appears to be just as talented a writer as Shakespeare; indeed, all of his lines in Something Rotten are quotes from Shakespeare's plays. He is athletically skilled, having lived much of his life avoiding cloned creatures. His name developed from a typo at Jasper Fforde's keyboard, which he subsequently loved.

St Zvlkx
A thirteenth-century prophet from Swindon, St Zvlkx's sixth Revealment was a prediction of his own resurrection in 1988, which Joffy Next prepares for by learning Old English to communicate with the saint. Joffy and the Idolatry Friends of St Zvlkx had sold the seer's wisdom to the Toast Marketing Board, which Zvlkx approved of. Over his stay in the twentieth century he is revealed to live nothing like a saintly life, and he is killed by a bus on the way to a bookie's. After Thursday helps the Swindon Mallets croquet team win the Superhoop, fulfilling the seventh and final Revealment, Thursday's father explains that Zvlkx had travelled through time himself, and that his Revealments were in fact bets now worth billions of pounds. Because the bookie's was owned ultimately by Goliath, the Toast Marketing Board took control of the majority of the multinational and ended their reign over England.

First Among Sequels

Jenny Next
Jenny is the youngest of Thursday's three children, and ten years old during the time of the 5th novel. She is the only child in Thursday's family not to be named after a day of the week, so that (in Thursday's words) "one of us should have a semblance of normality". Jenny never actually makes an appearance during the novel, and is later revealed to be nonexistent, placed in Thursday's mind in an act of vengeance by Aornis Hades. Thursday occasionally remembers this, then forgets that she has remembered. Thursday's family understands this and works to keep 'Jenny' alive to save her from torment. Jenny is revealed to have a 'life' of her own, as imaginary entities are stories themselves. And fictional entities can interact with the real world. Later, through the actions of outside forces, the entire family comes to remember Jenny as a loving and kind daughter who passed away young in a transportation accident.

Thursday1-4
Thursday1-4 is the fictional version of Thursday Next, the main character of the first four books in a bestselling series loosely based on Thursday's adventures in SpecOps and Jurisfiction. Thursday1-4 is portrayed as unnecessarily violent and somewhat sleazy, and the real Thursday describes her as being "mostly action, and very little thought." Despite the books being set several years before, Thursday1-4's apparent age is identical to the real Thursday, a fact that is explained in One of Our Thursdays Is Missing.

Thursday5
Thursday5 is the main character in the fifth book of the Thursday Next series. In response to the real Thursday's complaints about her portrayal in the first four books, and her insistence that the fifth book in the series reflect her more sensitive side, the fictional Thursday5 is depicted as overly softhearted and a bit of a hippie. Thursday takes her on as a cadet for training for Jurisfiction, but is consistently frustrated by Thursday5's incompetence and excessive pacifism. Like Thursday1-4, Thursday5 also looks identical to the real Thursday, despite a supposed age difference.

One of Our Thursdays Is Missing

The Woman Who Died a Lot

Thursday Next